Agabus undulatus is a species of beetle native to the Palearctic, including Europe, where it is only found in Albania, Austria, Belarus, Belgium, Bosnia and Herzegovina, Great Britain including Shetland, Orkney, Hebrides and Isle of Man, Bulgaria, Croatia, the Czech Republic, mainland Denmark, Estonia, mainland France, Germany, Hungary, mainland Italy, Kaliningrad, Latvia, Lithuania, Luxembourg, mainland Norway, Poland, Russia, Slovakia, Slovenia,  Sweden, Switzerland, the Netherlands, and Ukraine.

External links

Agabus undulatus at Fauna Europaea
Global Biodiversity Information Facility

undulatus
Beetles described in 1776
Taxa named by Franz von Paula Schrank